Politics is the process observed in all human (and many non-human) group interactions by which groups make decisions, including activism on behalf of specific issues or causes.  

Politics may also refer to:

Film and television 
 "Politics" (Stargate SG-1), a 1998 episode of the television series Stargate SG-1
 Politics (2004 film), a 2004 stand-up show by Ricky Gervais
 Politics (1931 film), a 1931 American comedy film
 Raajneeti (translation Politics), a 2010 Indian film

Music 
 Politics (Yellowjackets album), a 1988 album
 Politics (Sébastien Tellier album), a 2004 album
 "Politics" (Royce da 5'9" song), a 2005 song
 "Politics" (song), a 2006 song by Korn
 "Political" (song), a song by Spirit of the West

Other
 Politics (Aristotle), a treatise on philosophy
 Politics (novel), a 2003 book by Adam Thirlwell
 "Politics" (poem), by William Butler Yeats
 Politics (academic journal), a British academic journal of the Political Studies Association
 politics (1940s magazine), an American politics magazine published by Dwight Macdonald in the 1940s
 Politics (trade magazine), a trade magazine covering political campaigns and political consulting, founded in 1980, renamed Campaigns & Elections
 Politics (essay), an essay written by Ralph Waldo Emerson

See also 
 Politics.co.uk
 Political science
 Politix, an Australian men's clothing brand
 Workplace politics